Nicholas Seymour may refer to:

Nicholas Seymour (musician)
Nicholas Seymour (MP) for Gloucestershire